Sport Club Bonifika, commonly referred to as SC Bonifika or simply Bonifika, was a Slovenian football club. It has played in Koper until 2007, when it moved to Izola, intending to merge with MNK Izola. In the spring part of the 2008–09 season, the club moved to Sežana, but soon withdrew from the competition and ceased all operations.

Honours

Slovenian Third League
 Winners: 2005–06

Littoral League (fourth tier)
 Winners: 2004–05

References

Association football clubs established in 2004
Defunct football clubs in Slovenia
2004 establishments in Slovenia
Association football clubs disestablished in 2009
2009 disestablishments in Slovenia